The Ultimate may refer to:

 The Ultimate or the Absolute, the concept of an unconditional reality which transcends limited, conditional, everyday existence
 The Ultimate (Animorphs), a book by K.A. Applegate in the Animorphs series
 The Ultimate (Elvin Jones album), 1968
 The Ultimate (Grace Jones album), 1993
 The Ultimate (Jo Stafford album)
 The Ultimate (roller coaster), a steel roller coaster at Lightwater Valley amusement park, England

See also
 Ultimate (disambiguation)